Mantua Municipal Museum is a museum located in the José Martí street Mantua, Cuba. The building was constructed in 1901. It was established as a museum on 23 December 1980.

It has five rooms and holds several collections on local history and newspapers, and objects of the Cuban War of Independence and the 26th July Movement.

See also 
 List of museums in Cuba

References 

Museums in Cuba
Buildings and structures in Pinar del Río Province
Museums established in 1980
1980 establishments in Cuba
20th-century architecture in Cuba